The Biraja Temple, or Birija Kshetra  (Odia:ବିରଜା ମନ୍ଦିର, Birajā Kṣetra), is a historic Hindu temple located in Jajpur (about  north of Bhubaneswar), Odisha, India. The present temple was built during the 13th century. The principal idol is Devi Durga, who is worshiped as Viraja (Girija), and the temple gave Jajpur the nicknames "Viraja Kshetra" and "Biraja Peetha". The Durga idol has two hands (dwibhuja), spearing the chest of Mahishasura with one hand and pulling his tail with the other. One of her feet is on a lion, and the other is on Mahishasura's chest. Mahishasura is depicted as a water buffalo. The idol's crown features Ganesha, a crescent moon and a lingam. The temple covers a large area, and has several shrines to Shiva and other deities. According to the Skanda Purana it cleanses pilgrims, and it is called the Viraja or the Biraja kshetra. Jajpur is believed to have about one crore of Shiva lingams.

In Tantra

The Brahmayamala Tantra has a hymn, "Aadya Stotra", dedicated to Shakti. In the hymn, Vimala is the goddess of Puri and Viraja (Girija) is the goddess worshiped in the Utkala Kingdom, which became Odisha.

According to the Tantra Chudamani, Sati's navel fell in the Utkala Kingdom, also known as "Viraja kshetra". Adi Shankara, in his Ashtadasha Shakti Peetha Stuti describes the goddess as Girija. In Tantra literature, the Oddiyana Peetha (Devnagari:ओड़्याण पीठ) is located in eastern India near the Vaitarani River (an Oddiyana is an ornament worn by a woman around her navel).

Sree Bagalamukhi Deity
There is a separate shrine for Sree Bagalamukhi Devi, which is right of Maa Biraja. One can find very few temples for this Roopa of Dasamahavidya

Nabhi Gaya
Pitapuram holds the Pada Gaya, the Sira Gaya is found in Bihar, the Nabhi Gaya is found here in the form of a well. Pitru Pooja (Pinda Daan, Tarpan, Tithi) are performed here. The temple itself arranges the priests and the pooja items.

Rituals and festivals
The primary ritual in the temple is Sharadiya Durga Puja, which begins on the night of Krishna Paksha Ashtami. This falls before Mahalaya, and ends on Ashwin Shukla Paksha Navami. The puja, known as Shodasha Dinatatmika Puja, lasts for 16 days. The ratha (chariot festival) is known as Simhadhwaja, and its flag bears a lion. During the lunar transition from Shukla Ashtami to Shukla Navami an animal sacrifice, Bali Daanam, is performed.  Navratri is celebrated as Aparajita Puja.

Other festivals include Nakshatra, Shravana, Prathamastami, Pana Sankranti, Raja Parva and Navanna. Devi is worshiped daily in accordance with Tantra and Agama traditions as Mahishasuramardini by the Brahmins of Jajpur.

Transportation
The nearest railway station is Cuttack and Jajpur Keonjhar Road. From there regular buses can be availed to Jajpur town. Mostly private buses run regularly in Orissa. Autos connect Cuttack railway station to Barabati bus stand, which is hardly 3 km away. The bus from Cuttack to Jajapur town takes 2 to  hours. From Jajpur road to Jajpur town travelling time by road will be more than one hour. Also buses are available from Bhubaneswar. Buses which have express written on the buses are quicker than local buses.

Accommodation
A couple of lodges are next to the temple and another is being constructed.

See also
Yajna Varaha Temple
Oddiyana

References
More About Temples Jajpur
Trilochaneswar Temple of Jajpur
Biraja Temple Official Website
Pictures of Biraja Temple
Report on Biraja Temple
51 Shakti peetha, Viraja among shakti peetha

External links
Yoga Guru's visit to Oddiyana Viraja Temple and Nabhi Gaya Photos
Oddyane Girija Devi
Maa Biraja Website Developer & Adviser
Maa Biraja Devi Shakti Peeth Darshan Full Video

Hindu temples in Jajpur district
Shakti Peethas